Chelsea Hackett (born October 29, 1999) is an Australian kickboxer, mixed martial artist and muay thai fighter.

Early life
Hackett was born in Melbourne and moved with her family to the Gold Coast at an early age. She attended St Andrews Lutheran College throughout her upbringing and began her martial arts journey at an after school Taekwando program at eight years old. By the age of 12, Hackett had achieved a junior black belt in Taekwando and sought out a new challenge in the form of Muay Thai under the tutelage of 10-time world champion John Wayne Parr at his Boonchu Gym on the Gold Coast. She won gold medals at the IFMA World Muaythai Championships in both 2014 and 2015 on her way to amassing a professional Muay Thai record of 16-4-3, which included two world title victories and winning the WBC World Lightweight Championship. Hackett transitioned into Mixed martial arts full-time in 2019 and adopted the nickname Ham Sandwich.

Mixed martial arts career
Hackett made her professional MMA debut in May 2019 for Australia's Eternal MMA promotion walked away with a majority draw that would have been a unanimous decision victory had she not been deducted a point in the first round for holding the fence. She competed for the Eternal MMA promotion three more times over the following 12 months and was victorious in every bout. Hackett was then invited to compete at Dana White's Contender Series 36 where she fought and lost to Victoria Leonardo on November 17, 2020 for an UFC contract.

Championships and accomplishments

Muay Thai
 WMC Muaythai Female Super Lightweight World Champion

Mixed martial arts record

|-
| Loss
| align=center| 3–1–1
| Victoria Leonardo
| TKO (punches)
| Dana White's Contender Series 36
| 
| align=center| 2
| align=center| 4:41
| Las Vegas, Nevada, United States
| 
|-
| Win
| align=center| 3–0–1
| Rhiannon Thompson
| Decision (unanimous)
| Eternal MMA 52
| 
| align=center| 3
| align=center| 5:00
| Gold Coast, Queensland, Australia
| 
|-
| Win
| align=center| 2–0–1
| Nicole Szepesvary
| KO (slam)
| Eternal MMA 49
| 
| align=center| 2
| align=center| 0:08
| Gold Coast, Queensland, Australia
| 
|-
| Win
| align=center| 1–0–1
| Danielle Hayes
| Decision (unanimous)
| Eternal MMA 46
| 
| align=center| 3
| align=center| 5:00
| Melbourne, Victoria, Australia
| 
|-
| Draw
| align=center| 0–0–1
| Mel Zeman
| Draw (majority)
| Eternal MMA 45
| 
| align=center| 3
| align=center| 5:00
| Gold Coast, Queensland, Australia
| 
|-

Television appearances
In 2021, Hackett competed on Australian Survivor: Brains V Brawn.

References

1991 births
Mixed martial artists from the Gold Coast
Sportswomen from Queensland
Living people
Australian female taekwondo practitioners
Australian female kickboxers
Featherweight kickboxers
Lightweight kickboxers
Australian Muay Thai practitioners
Female Muay Thai practitioners
Australian female mixed martial artists
Mixed martial artists utilizing Muay Thai
Mixed martial artists utilizing taekwondo
Mixed martial artists utilizing boxing
Australian Survivor contestants